Nitrofurans are a class of drugs typically used as antibiotics or antimicrobials. The defining structural component is a furan ring with a nitro group.

Drugs 
Members of this class of drugs include:
 Antibacterials (antibiotics)
 Difurazone (also known as Nitrovin) — an antibacterial growth promoter used in the animal feeds
 Furazolidone
 Nifurfoline
 Nifuroxazide
 Nifurquinazol
 Nifurtoinol
 Nifurzide
 Nitrofural (also known as nitrofurazone)
 Nitrofurantoin — a drug used to treat urinary tract infections
 Ranbezolid — technically an oxazolidinone antibiotic bearing a nitrofuran group
 Antimicrobials
 Furaltadone — an antiprotozoal
 Furazidine — an antibacterial and antiprotozoal
 Furaginum — an antibacterial
 Furylfuramide — a formerly used food preservative
 Nifuratel — an antiprotozoal and antifungal
 Nifurtimox — an antiprotozoal
 FANFT, a potent nitrofuran derivative tumor initiator. It causes bladder tumors in all animals studied and is mutagenic to many bacteria.

Regulation
The European Union has banned the use of Nitrofurans in food-producing animals. In the 2000s, a number of meat imports were destroyed after nitrofurans were found, including chicken imported from Portugal, and chicken imported from Thailand and Brazil.

References

External links